Barca is a municipality located in the province of Soria, in the autonomous community of Castile and León, Spain.

Included in the Natura 2000 network is a Site of Community Importance known as Riberas del Río Duero y afluentes (Riberas del Río Duero and tributaries), which occupies .

References

Municipalities in the Province of Soria